Oliver McQuaid (born 10 July 1954) is an Irish former cyclist. He competed in the individual road race event at the 1976 Summer Olympics.

References

External links
 

1954 births
Living people
Irish male cyclists
Olympic cyclists of Ireland
Cyclists at the 1976 Summer Olympics
Place of birth missing (living people)